Hipertensão (season 1) was the first season of the Brazilian stunt/dare reality television show Hipertensão, which premiered April 14, 2002, with the season finale airing May 5, 2002 on the Rede Globo television network.

Overview
The series debuted as a replacement on April 14, 2002. The first season was planned to be displayed for exacts four weeks (plus a celebrity special) during the break month between the first two seasons of Big Brother Brasil. However, even the short run prevented the series from being subject to criticism and controversy.

Format
The season 1 format involved three men and three women, who had to complete three professional stunts to win R$50,000. If a contestant was too scared to attempt a stunt, failed to complete a stunt, or (in some cases) had the worst performance on a stunt, they were eliminated from the competition.

Production

Cast
There was no application process for the series first season. The twenty-four contestants (six in each of the four episodes) were selected from applications received for another Rede Globo shows, such No Limite 3 (2001) and Big Brother Brasil 1 (2002).

Filming
Filming took place at the montane region of the state of Rio de Janeiro, in Brazil. The coastal zone of the same state was also used. Filming run from early-April, 2002, until mid-May, 2002.

Episodes

Episode 1
First Air Date: April 14, 2002

Contestants

In Stunt 1, contestants would be riding on the back of a jet ski as a helicopter flew overhead. They would have to grab on to the helicopter skit and use the cargo netting to climb into the helicopter. In Stunt 2, contestants would have to drink a drink containing 6 earthworms, 4 beetles and 1 cockroach. In Stunt 3, contestants would have to walk across a  balance beam over 100 feet high, retrieve a flag, walk back across, and plant the flag. The contestant to do this the fastest would win the $50,000.

Episode 2
First Air Date: April 21, 2002

Contestants

In Stunt 1, the contestants would have to jump off a tower 30 meters high and hold on for five seconds to a network positioned 2.5 meters away. In Stunt 2, the contestants must to remain four minutes stranded in a pit with 300 rats. In Stunt 3, the contestants would be hung by their ankles over 130 feet high and dropped down a zip line at 60 miles per hour. As they went over a large target, they would have to drop a beanbag. The contestant whose beanbag landed closest to the bull's-eye would win the $50,000.

Episode 3
First Air Date: April 28, 2002

Contestants

In Stunt 1, the contestants were dragged by two horses on a road covered with mud. In Stunt 2, the contestants facing an aquarium with 25 snakes, where they had to "fish" plums with their own mouths. In Stunt 3 the contestants had to go into a sewer pipe and try to find the exit faster than the others. The contestant who find the exit first would win the $50,000.

Episode 4
First Air Date: May 05, 2002

Contestants

In Stunt 1, the contestants had to jump from one to another truck at 60 miles an hour. In Stunt 2, the contestants eating crickets. In Stunt 3, the contestants had to hold the breath for as long as possible, dipped upside down in a water tank; The contestant to do this the fastest would win the $50,000.

Criticism and Controversy

The season, which lasted only five weeks, received mixed reviews. São Paulo Public Ministry established a public civil inquiry to investigate the show. Lawyer Leonardo Fogaça Pantaleon even hinted that the show humiliated people and hurt the citizens rights.

References

External links

Hipertensão
2002 Brazilian television seasons